Galesh-e Musha (also Romanized as Gālesh-e Mūshā) is a village in Malfejan Rural District, in the Central District of Siahkal County, Gilan Province, Iran. At the 2006 census, its population was 91, in 33 families.

References 

Populated places in Siahkal County